Barbara Jones may refer to:

Barbara Jones (artist) (1912–1978), English artist, writer and mural painter
Barbara Jones (astronomer), British and American infrared astronomer
Barbara Jones (diplomat), Irish diplomat
Barbara Jones (singer) (c. 1952–2014), Jamaican singer
Barbara Jones (skier) (born 1977), American Olympic skier
Barbara Jones (sprinter) (born 1937), American track and field sprinter
Barbara A. Jones, American physicist
Barbara Ann Posey Jones (born 1943), leader of the 1958 Katz Drug Store sit-in as a high school student
Barbara E. Jones, American-Canadian neuroscientist
Barbara O. Jones, American actress
Barbara S. Jones (born 1947), federal judge for the US District Court for the Southern District of New York